2015–16 Vijay Hazare Trophy is the 14th season of the Vijay Hazare Trophy, a List A cricket tournament in India. It is contested by 27 domestic cricket teams of India divided into 4 Groups. The winner will advance to play 2015–16 Deodhar Trophy.
The top two teams advanced to the quarter finals.

Fixtures

Round one
CV Stephen and left-arm spinner B Sudhakar bowled Andhra to a 58-run thumping win against Tripura in Delhi.

Delhi pacer, Subodh Bhati claimed four for 17 on debut to help his team to a comprehensive 31-run win against a strong Baroda team comprising Ambati Rayudu, Yusuf Pathan and Irfan Pathan. After Nitish Rana's 62 followed by Pawan Negi's, 57-ball 47* helped Delhi cross to 208 at the Feroz Shah Kotla, the pace trio of Bhati, Pradeep Sangwan and N A Saini helped warp-up Baroda for 177 and take the team to victory.

Deepak Hooda made a half-century for Baroda as he valiantly looked to hold the innings together. 

Defending 226, Alok Sahoo bowled Odisha to a thrilling three-run win against Vidarbha. The pacer claimed a five-for to help his team to victory, while Basant Mohanty bowled S Badrinath and trapped top-order batsman Ganesh Satish to keep Vidarbha in check. R Jangid's 105-ball 97 and A Karnewar's 72 had kept Vidarbha in the fray but B Samnataray accounted for the former while Sahoo sent back the latter and ran through the lower-order to post a win.

Round two
Kedar Devdhar (81) and Aditya Waghmode's (76) 159-run opening stand laid the foundation for a respectable total for Baroda. Deepak Hooda(53) and Yusuf Pathan's quickfire 36-ball 46* took the team to 291.

Defending the target, Bhargav Bhatt bowled the team to victory with a six-wicket haul. The left-arm spinner claimed six for 37, while Yusuf picked one as the spun Andhra out for 202.

While Ishant Sharma claimed five for 21 to bowl Vidarbha out for 163, Faiz Fazal played a crucial 125-ball 83-run knock that set Delhi a 164-run target.

The Vidarbha bowling unit then complemented each other and bowled in tandem to wrap-up Delhi for 145. Umesh Yadav gave the team their first breakthrough with the key wicket of Gautam Gambhir for six. Although Unmukt Chand fought to keep Delhi in the game with a 91-ball 57, the rest of the lineup succumbed to the Vidarbha attack.

Spinners Akshay Wakhare, A Karnewar and R Jangid claimed two wickets each while Yadav too finished with two as they bowled the team to victory.

Shrikant Mundhe's all-round performance helped Maharashtra post a win in their opening game of the season in the one-day tournament. The lower middle-order batsman's half-century helped the team to a modest 217 for eight. He then returned to claim four for 35 while off-spinner S Kazi took four wickets for 28 runs to help bowl Odisha out for 177. Odisha's top-scorer, Govind Podder (74) was among the spinner's wickets.

Round three

Round four

Round five

Round six

Round seven

References

Domestic cricket competitions in 2015–16